Trupanea bisdiversa is a species of tephritid or fruit flies in the genus Trupanea of the family Tephritidae.

Distribution
Kenya, Malawi, Zimbabwe, South Africa.

References

Tephritinae
Insects described in 1924
Diptera of Africa